Grizzly is an American brand of dipping tobacco (moist snuff) that was introduced in 2001. It is made by the American Snuff Company.

History

Grizzly was first sold in 2001 at lower prices and was originally available in Long Cut Wintergreen (green tin) and Fine Cut Natural (red tin). By the end of 2006, Long Cut Straight (maroon tin), Long Cut Mint (blue tin), Long Cut Natural (silver tin) and Fine Cut Wintergreen (olive tin) were also introduced.  Snuff and Wintergreen Pouches were released in 2008, and also began an attempt to change its market position into an upmarket brand.  Metal lids became standard in 2010, replacing the previous all-plastic cans.  Wide Cut Wintergreen was released in 2014 , Dark Wintergreen Long Cut and Pouches were released in 2015 and Dark Mint long cut and pouches released in September 2016.

As of December 2014, Grizzly was cited as the flagship brand of Reynolds American with a 31.1% market share in snuff brands.

Varieties

 Long Cut Natural (Also known as Grizzly 1900 Long Cut, or Grizzly Natural 1900)
 Fine Cut Natural
 Extra Long Cut Natural
 Snuff
 Snuff Pouches
 Long Cut Straight
 Straight Pouches
 Long Cut Mint
 Mint Pouches
 Fine Cut Wintergreen
 Long Cut Wintergreen
 Wintergreen Pouches
 Wide Cut Wintergreen
 Long Cut Dark Wintergreen (fire-cured tobacco)
 Dark Wintergreen Pouches
 Long Cut Dark Mint
 Long Cut Dark Straight / Select

References

External links
 

Chewing tobacco brands
IARC Group 1 carcinogens